Kamyshi is a rural locality (a khutor) in Ilyevskoye Rural Settlement, Kalachyovsky District, Volgograd Oblast, Russia. The population was 397 as of 2010. There are 23 streets.

Geography 
Kamyshi is located in steppe, on Yergeny, 10 km northwest of Kalach-na-Donu (the district's administrative centre) by road. Kalach-na-Donu is the nearest rural locality.

References 

Rural localities in Kalachyovsky District